The 2014 Abierto Tampico was a professional tennis tournament played on outdoor hard courts. It was the second edition of the tournament which was part of the 2014 ITF Women's Circuit, offering a total of $50,000 in prize money. It took place in Tampico, Mexico, on 13–19 October 2014.

Singles entrants

Seeds 

 1 Rankings as of 6 October 2014

Other entrants 
The following players received wildcards into the singles main draw:
  Carolina Betancourt
  Victoria Rodríguez
  Ana Sofía Sánchez
  Marcela Zacarías

The following players received entry from the qualifying draw:
  Paula Badosa
  Kateryna Bondarenko
  Petra Krejsová
  Laura Pous Tió

The following player received entry as a special exempt:
  Patricia Maria Țig

Champions

Singles 

  Mariana Duque def.  An-Sophie Mestach 3–6, 6–1, 7–6(7–4)

Doubles 

  Petra Martić /  Maria Sanchez def.  Kateryna Bondarenko /  Valeria Savinykh 3–6, 6–3, [10–2]

External links 
 2014 Abierto Tampico at ITFtennis.com
 Official website

2014 ITF Women's Circuit
2014 in Mexican tennis
October 2014 sports events in Mexico
Abierto Tampico